The following highways are numbered 130:

Canada
 New Brunswick Route 130
 Ontario Highway 130
 Prince Edward Island Route 130

Costa Rica
 National Route 130

India
 National Highway 130 (India)

Japan
 Japan National Route 130

Korea, South
 Incheon International Airport Expressway

Mexico
 Mexican Federal Highway 130

United States
 Interstate 130 (former proposal)
 U.S. Route 130
 Alabama State Route 130
 Arkansas Highway 130
 Arkansas Highway 130 (1930s-1950s)(former)
 California State Route 130
 Connecticut Route 130
 County Road 130 (Baker County, Florida)
 Georgia State Route 130
 Hawaii Route 130
 Illinois Route 130
 Illinois Route 130A (former)
 Indiana State Road 130
 Iowa Highway 130
 K-130 (Kansas highway)
 Kentucky Route 130
 Louisiana Highway 130
 Maine State Route 130
 Maryland Route 130
 Massachusetts Route 130
 M-130 (Michigan highway) (former)
 County Road 130 (Hennepin County, Minnesota)
 Missouri Route 130
 New Hampshire Route 130
 County Route 130 (Bergen County, New Jersey)
 New Mexico State Road 130
 New York State Route 130
 County Route 130 (Erie County, New York)
 County Route 130 (Herkimer County, New York)
 County Route 130 (Niagara County, New York)
 County Route 130 (Rensselaer County, New York)
 North Carolina Highway 130
 Ohio State Route 130
 Oklahoma State Highway 130
 Oregon Route 130
 Pennsylvania Route 130
 South Carolina Highway 130
 South Dakota Highway 130
 Tennessee State Route 130
 Texas State Highway 130
 Texas State Highway Loop 130
 Farm to Market Road 130
 Utah State Route 130
 Virginia State Route 130
 Virginia State Route 130 (1928-1933) (former)
 Wisconsin Highway 130
 Wyoming Highway 130

Territories
 Puerto Rico Highway 130